The Pearson–Robinson House is a historic house at 1900 Marshall Street in Little Rock, Arkansas.  It is a -story brick building, with a dormered hip roof, and a broad porch extending across the front.  The porch is supported by brick piers, and has a bracketed eave.  It was built in 1900 by Raleigh Pearson, and was purchased in 1903 by future United States Senator and Governor of Arkansas Joseph Taylor Robinson.  It has also been home to Governors George W. Hays, Charles H. Brough, Thomas C. McRae, and Tom Jefferson Terral.

The house was listed on the National Register of Historic Places in 1978.

See also
Joseph Taylor Robinson House
National Register of Historic Places listings in Little Rock, Arkansas

References

Houses on the National Register of Historic Places in Arkansas
Houses completed in 1900
Houses in Little Rock, Arkansas
National Register of Historic Places in Little Rock, Arkansas
Historic district contributing properties in Arkansas